Jagdschloss, officially the FuG 404, was the designation of a German early warning and battle control radar developed just prior to the start of World War II. Although it was built in limited numbers, Jadgschloss is historically important as the first radar system to feature a plan position indicator display, or "PPI". In Germany this type of display was referred to as "Panorama". It is named for Jagdschloss, a hunting lodge.

Development
The PPI effort started fairly early in the history of radar; Hans Hollmann filed a patent for the basic concept in 1936. At that time development of GEMA's other radars, notably the Freya, took priority, and work on the system did not start until 1939. By this time, radar development had progressed to the point were a prototype could be constructed by re-using systems from various production radars.

A prototype system was built 35 km west of Berlin, known as the Tremmen Radar Tower. It mounted a large antenna consisting of two rows of four half-wave dipoles aligned horizontally, rotating on a shaft located at the top of the tower. It was found that at least five pulses needed to be returned in order for the target to become visible on the scope, so the rotation rate of the antenna was adjusted to synchronize with the pulse repetition frequency of the radar. The radio equipment was taken from the Wassermann and Freya units, and operated on a basic wavelength of 2.4 m (~125 MHz).

Production units
Although the system demonstrated its utility, further units were not ordered until the fall of 1942, likely due to the increasing tempo of RAF Bomber Command's night offensives at that time. New electronics were built for the production units, operating on one of two bands, the A band on 1.2-1.9 m or the B band on 1.9-2.5 m. The first production sets were delivered by Siemens & Halske at the end of 1943, and when production ended in April 1945 a total of 80 units had been delivered.

Jagdschloss units were found to have several "dead spots" due to the antenna being located on an  tower. For instance, an aircraft flying at  altitude at any range between  would be invisible because the direct reflection from the aircraft would interfere with the one reflecting off the ground. This problem was initially solved with the addition of a large wire mesh under the tower, known as Reflektor-Netz.

A more convincing solution to this problem was deployed as Jagdschloss Michael. Michael added a second antenna on the "back" of the original, operating on a 50 cm wavelength system from Telefunken (almost certainly adapted from their Würzburg radar). Range was also increased from the original , which required an improvement in the angular resolution in order to maintain the ability to resolve aircraft. To achieve this, Michael used a new  antenna replacing the older 24 m one. The antenna was so large that the mounting had to be re-designed, with the antenna supported by rollers running in a track as opposed to being mounted off a central shaft.

Another cm-wavelength experiment was built at Werneuchen, east of Berlin, known as Jagdschloss Z. This system operated on a 9 cm wavelength, which was very short for the era. The antenna was built up from the center sections of the Würzburg radar's parabolic dish, stacked vertically to form a single 72-wavelength aperture antenna.

Jagdschloss units of all types were optionally fitted with the Erstling IFF system. Like British IFF units, Erstling fed back its own return upon reception of a Jadgschloss signal. The return signal was slightly delayed, appearing as a second "blip" on the radar screen, allowing the operator to visually identify friendly aircraft. Unlike British systems, Erstling apparently sent back a morse code signal in return.

The FuG25a "Erstling" had two encryption keys inside, each of 10 bits. One called "Reichskennung" and the other "Verbandskennung " (squadron key).

A related system, Jagdhütte (German: "hunting lodge"), is also mentioned in reference to Erstling. This was a reduced version of Jagdschloss without radar receiver, operating only with the IFF Signals from Erstling. This was for control of the Luftwaffe's own night fighters only. Due to the different transmit and receiving frequencies, it was resistant against Düppel interference.

Another optional system for use with Jagdschloss was a remote PPI display known as Landbriefträger (German: country mailman). This allowed the display from a Jadgschloss site to be sent via telephone lines to the flak defenses so they could arrange their attacks locally. Signals from the original Tremmen and the later Werneuchen radars were forwarded to the flak tower close by the Berlin Zoo.

Notes

The document states that the Jagdschloss units worked in two bands in the description text, but in three bands in another part of the document. The third band is 2.4 to 4.0 m.
The document's description of Jagdschloss Michael states the second signal was sent out of the back of the antenna, and operated on a 50 cm wavelength. However, the description is not entirely clear, and the difference in wavelengths would make this somewhat difficult to arrange. Generally the range of a 50 cm unit would also be shorter than longer wavelengths on the other side, due to limitations of the electronics of the era, but the document does not state if the range of this "side" of the system was any different.

References
Development of the first PPI Radar (Funkmess-Uebersichstverfahren), Dr. Ing. Theodore Schultes, translated into English by Martin Hollmann
 Swords, Sean S., Technical History of the Beginnings of Radar, London: IEE/Peter Peregrinus, 1986. .

World War II German radars
Military equipment introduced from 1940 to 1944